Wende–Bauckus syndrome  is a cutaneous condition characterized by tiny white macules on the trunk with confluence within flexures.

See also 
 Waardenburg syndrome
 List of cutaneous conditions

References 

Disturbances of human pigmentation
Syndromes